Agathiceras applini is a species of Agathiceras, named by Plummer and Scott in 1937.

The mollusc was a fast moving nektonic carnivore and had an average shell width of 6.23 mm and shell diameter of 9.54 mm.

References

Agathiceratidae
Fossil taxa described in 1937